Union Sportive de Frères (or simply US Frères) is a professional football club based in Pétion-Ville, Haiti. The club last played in the first division in the 2005–06 season.

References

Football clubs in Haiti
Ouest (department)